Region 11 or Region XI can refer to:

 Former Region 11 (Johannesburg), an administrative district in the city of Johannesburg, South Africa, from 2000 to 2006
Aisén Region, Chile
Davao Region, Philippines

Region name disambiguation pages